2001 Kishtwar massacre was the killing of 17 Hindu villagers in village Ladder near Kishtwar in Doda District of Jammu and Kashmir by Lashkar-e-Taiba militants on 3 August 2001 .

The attack
According to the police, a group of 10 militants swooped on the village and dragged 20 males belonging to the Hindu community out of their houses. They were taken to the adjacent rocky mountain belt and shot. Five villagers were wounded.

The aftermath
These killings were subsequently discussed in Indian parliament with opposition criticizing the Government. Lashkar-e-Taiba terrorist Mujib-ur-Rahman was killed by security forces 3 days later.  His logbook had an entry dated 3 August, "The warriors of the Lashkar-e-Toiba have killed 19 unbelievers. This is our challenge to the Indian government."  A complete bandh was observed in Jammu the following day in protest.  Groups of demonstrators protesting against the Kishtwar carnage torched Pakistani flags and effigies of Gen Pervez Musharraf in Jammu, Kathua and Udhampur.

References

21st-century mass murder in India
Mass murder in 2001
August 2001 events in India